is the seventh single by Japanese entertainer Akina Nakamori. Written by Chinfa Kan and Tetsuji Hayashi, the single was released on January 1, 1984, by Warner Pioneer through the Reprise label. It was also the lead single from her fifth studio album Anniversary.

Background 
Nakamori approached songwriters Kan and Hayashi after listening to Omega Tribe's 1983 single "Summer Suspicion". During the songwriting process, proposed titles included  and  before Nakamori settled with "Kita Wing", which she revealed was influenced by Yumi Matsutoya's . "Kita Wing" refers to the north wing of Narita International Airport's Terminal 1, with the lyrics referencing Japan Airlines Flight 401 flying to London Heathrow Airport via Anchorage.

Nakamori, Kan, and Hayashi collaborated again on a sequel song titled , which was featured on Nakamori's sixth studio album Possibility.

Nakamori has re-recorded "Kita Wing" for the 2002 self-cover compilation Utahime Double Decade and the 2006 compilation Best Finger 25th Anniversary Selection. In 2010, she re-recorded the song for the pachinko machine .

Chart performance 
"Kita Wing" peaked at No. 2 on Oricon's weekly singles chart and sold over 614,200 copies.

Track listing 
All lyrics are written by Chinfa Kan, except where indicated; all music is composed and arranged by Tetsuji Hayashi.

Charts

Cover versions 
 Kream covered the song on their 1996 album Time Machine ni Onegai.
 Chinephile covered the song on their 2003 cover album Kayomania.
 Akiko Matsumoto covered the song on her 2013 compilation album King of Pops 2.
 Penicillin covered the song as the B-side of their 2014 single "Sol".
 Sora Amamiya covered the song on her 2021 cover album Covers: Sora Amamiya Favorite Songs.

References

External links 
 
 
 

1984 singles
1984 songs
Akina Nakamori songs
Japanese-language songs
Songs with lyrics by Chinfa Kan
Songs written by Tetsuji Hayashi
Warner Music Japan singles
Reprise Records singles